Joshua Milton Blahyi (born September 30, 1971), better known by his nom de guerre General Butt Naked, is a Liberian evangelical preacher, writer and former warlord best known for his actions during the First Liberian Civil War. During the conflict, Blahyi led a group of soldiers which fought on the side of rebel group United Liberation Movement of Liberia for Democracy (ULIMO) before converting to Christianity and becoming a pastor in 1996.

Born in the Liberian capital of Monrovia to a Krahn family, Blahyi was handed by his father to several tribal elders who initiated him as a high priest in 1982 at the age of eleven. After Armed Forces of Liberia (AFL) officer Samuel K. Doe staged a coup d'état against President William R. Tolbert in 1980, the new regime employed Blahyi to perform black magic rituals at the presidential palace in Monrovia to help him win the 1985 general election.

In 1989, National Patriotic Front of Liberia (NPFL) rebel leader Charles Taylor launched a rebellion against Doe's regime, sparking a civil war. Blahyi joined ULIMO, a rival militia group, and operated primarily around the Monrovia area. During the conflict, Blahyi and his men, a group of soldiers known as the Naked Base Commandos, fought without clothing and perpetrated numerous atrocities, including child sacrifice and cannibalism.

Blahyi abandoned his life as a warlord and turned to preaching after undergoing a religious conversion in 1996, attributing these actions to receiving a vision of Jesus. In 2008, Blahyi testified at the Liberian Truth and Reconciliation Commission, claiming that his victims numbered at least 20,000 individuals. The public testimony brought mixed reactions and led to international attention, leading Blahyi to be featured in several documentaries.

Early life

Joshua Milton Blahyi was born on September 30, 1971 in Monrovia, Liberia. He was born into a Krahn family, some of whom resided in Sinoe County, located in the south of the country; among the Krahn people, belief in child sacrifice and black magic was common. When he was seven years old, his father granted parental control over him to several Krahn elders, who arranged for Blahyi to be a warrior and initiated him as a high priest in 1982, when he was at the age of eleven.

As Blahyi noted in his memoirs, the role of high priest included overseeing human sacrifices. Blahyi, like other Krahn priests, would use visions to determine which individual would be sacrificed. After receiving the vision, Blahyi would "give the victim’s last name to its village elders", who would then lead a procession to the sacrifice victim's house, abducting and then sacrificing them atop an altar; after Blahyi stated a invocation, the victim would then be ritually dismembered.

In 1980, Armed Forces of Liberia (AFL) master-sergeant Samuel Doe staged a coup d'état, overthrowing then-President William Tolbert. Blahyi claims that Doe employed him to perform black magic rituals to influence the 1985 Liberian general election, although Doe's victory relied more practically on destroying most of the opposition's ballots. Blahyi later explained his support for Doe as being based on a sense of tribal loyalty, as they were both members of the same ethnic group.

Wartime actions

In 1989, Charles Taylor, a rebel leader in the National Patriotic Front of Liberia (NPFL), launched a rebellion against Doe, sparking the First Liberian Civil War. After Doe was murdered and his regime collapsed in 1990, the United Liberation Movement of Liberia for Democracy (ULIMO) was founded by Krahn and Mandinka refugees and former AFL soldiers in 1991. Blahyi became a member of ULIMO and fought against the NPFL and rival militias, which came to control most of Liberia amidst the conflict.

During the conflict, Blahyi became a warlord, leading a unit of several dozen combatants (consisting primarily of child soldiers) known as the Naked Base Commandos which operated primarily around the Monrovia area. The unit, including Blahyi himself, frequently wore no clothing except for their shoes and magic charms, earning Blahyi the nom de guerre 'General Butt Naked'. Blahyi claimed that this practice made him and his soldiers "immune to bullets." During the conflict, Blahyi's forces perpetrated numerous atrocities, including cannibalism and human sacrifice.

Blahyi would later claim that he had received a vision from the Devil during the conflict; in the vision, the Devil told him that he would become "a great warrior and should practice human sacrifice and cannibalism to increase his power." Recalling the atrocities he and his soldiers perpetrated against civilians during the conflict, Blahyi stated in an interview, “sometimes, I would enter under the water where children were playing. I would dive under the water, grab one, carry him under and break his neck. Sometimes I'd cause accidents. Sometimes I'd just slaughter them."

Blahyi also made his soldiers consume psychoactive drugs in order to make them more alert and willing to follow Blahyi's orders. He would later recall that whenever the Naked Base Commandos captured a town, “I had to make a human sacrifice. They bring to me a living child that I slaughter and take the heart out to eat it." The rival militias, including the Naked Base Commandos, frequently fought with each other over control over Liberia's lucrative diamond fields and gold mines, and Blahyi traded gold and diamonds with Mexican drug cartels for weapons and cocaine.

On April 6, 1996, the NPFL launched an operation to arrest ULIMO rebel leader Roosevelt Johnson in the Monrovia region, leading to Blahyi and other militias affiliated with Johnson to resist the attempt by force of arms. The ensuring confrontation led to an intense firefight breaking out, which ultimately resulted in the forced displacement of half of Monrovia's population. According to Damon Tabor of The New Yorker, during the firefight a bystander reported seeing Blahyi standing atop a truck, "holding an assault rifle in one hand and a man's severed genitals in the other."

Religious conversion

In 1996, as the civil war was drawing to a close, Blahyi claimed that as he saw the blood of a child on his hands, he received a vision of Jesus Christ, who "asked [Blahyi] to stop being a slave." After receiving the vision, Blahyi eventually converted to Christianity and became an evangelical preacher, ministering to Liberian refugees in Ghana along with former combatants who had served under him during the conflict. From 2006 onwards, Blahyi also made several visits to Monrovia's slums in an effort to engage with and assist former child soldiers who were living there.

In 2008, Blahyi became the first Liberian warlord to testify before the Liberian Truth and Reconciliation Commission, which was established by the Legislature of Liberia after the conflicts to investigate reports of atrocities allegedly perpetrated during the First and Second Liberian Civil Wars. During his testimony, which was broadcast live on television in Liberia, Blahyi testified that he believed the number of murders committed by him and the Naked Base Commandos to be at least 20,000 in total. He was recommended for prosecutorial amnesty by the commission.

In Liberia, his testimony elicited mixed responses; among the Liberian general public, Blahyi was both publicly praised and criticized for his actions during the war. The testimony also led to Blahyi becoming "front-page news" among Liberian press outlets, and several international journalists, including reporters from the Daily Mail and Vice Media, travelled to Liberia to conduct interviews with him. In 2007, Blahyi established Journeys Against Violence, a non-governmental organization with the stated aim of helping former combatants and street children to reintegrate into society.

Blahyi has publicly called for Liberia to establish a war crimes court in order to prosecute suspected war criminals, arguing that former warlords such as current Liberian senator Prince Johnson should go on trial in order "to account for their individual roles played and the actions of their respective troops which committed atrocities and war crimes during the Liberian civil conflicts." In an appearance on a Liberian talk show, Blahyi stated that he lives in regret almost every time not just because of the people who he made childless, but children who he deprived of their parents."

During his career as an evangelical preacher, Blahyi has attracted numerous benefactors from outside Liberia, including Bojan Jancic, a Christian pastor based in West Village, New York City. He would later write the foreword to The Redemption of an African Warlord, an autobiography written in 2013 by Blahyi and published by Destiny Image Publishers, described by Tabor as a "small Christian press". Jancic wrote in the book's foreword that "Not since the conversion of Saul of Tarsus on the Road to Damascus have I ever heard a conversion story more radically compelling."

In popular culture

Blahyi's notoriety and public testimony has led to numerous appearances in popular culture. In 2010, journalists from Vice News produced a documentary called The Vice Guide to Liberia as part of their road travel series The Vice Guide to Travel. In the documentary, Blahyi conducted an interview with the journalists, where he claimed that the planned withdrawal of the United Nations Mission in Liberia (UNMIL) in 2011 would lead to further violence breaking out in Liberia. The filmmakers also filmed Blahyi conducting a sermon in Monrovia in front of numerous former child soldiers.

In 2011, filmmakers Eric Strauss and Daniele Anastasion produced a documentary about Blahyi titled The Redemption of General Butt Naked, which was screened at the 2011 Sundance Film Festival. The documentary primarily focused on Blahyi's career as an ULIMO rebel leader and his life after converting to Christianity, documenting his efforts to both rehabilitate former military personnel under his command and reach out to the survivors of his atrocities in order to reconcile with them; interspersed between these was footage of his 2008 war crimes testimony.

The documentary received positive reviews; a review by Kirk Honeycutt for The Hollywood Reporter praised the documentary for foregoing "any personal judgments to let audiences draw their own conclusions", arguing that the filmmakers have "caught lightning in a bottle". Another review in Screen International by David D'Arcy was also positive, noting that the filmmakers had depicted the impact of the Liberian civil wars, describing the documentary as "staggeringly cinematic" and "one of the best titles since John Waters’s Pecker" which had "bravura visual flourishes".

The Book of Mormon, a 2013 satirical musical comedy written by screenwriters Trey Parker, Robert Lopez, and Matt Stone, features a character named "General Butt Fucking Naked"; the character is depicted in the musical as a Ugandan warlord, as he was originally modeled after infamous Lord's Resistance Army (LRA) commander Joseph Kony. Parker noted in an interview with Comingsoon.net that "warlords in Liberia have such colorful names and we were reading about the one named General Butt Naked. We just ripped off his joke, basically."

References

Notes

Footnotes

Bibliography

Websites

Books
 

1971 births
20th-century Liberian people
21st-century Liberian writers
African warlords
Converts to evangelical Christianity
Converts to Protestantism from pagan religions
Liberian cannibals
Liberian evangelicals
Liberian rebels
Liberian religious leaders
Living people
Krahn people
Crimes_involving_Satanism_or_the_occult
Military history of Liberia
Liberian mass murderers
War criminals